Erin Soros is a Canadian author of short stories. She was awarded the University of British Columbia's Governor General's Gold Medal for a master's degree in 2001 and the Commonwealth Prize for the Short Story in 2006. Her fiction has been published widely in such journals as the Indiana Review and the Iowa Review. She is a two-time finalist for the Robert Olen Butler Prize, a winner of the Canadian Broadcasting Corporation's Bob Weaver award for short fiction and has been awarded 2nd prize for the prestigious Costa Short Story Award 2016.  

One of her essays was named a notable essay in The Best American Essays 2005.

Life
She holds a Master of Arts in English from the University of British Columbia, a Master of Fine Arts in writing from Columbia University and has completed her PhD program in the school of literature, drama and creative writing at the University of East Anglia.

References

Living people
University of British Columbia alumni
Columbia University School of the Arts alumni
Alumni of the University of East Anglia
Canadian women short story writers
21st-century Canadian short story writers
21st-century Canadian women writers
Year of birth missing (living people)